Dennis Wolff (born March 1, 1955) is an American basketball coach whose most recent coaching position was with the Virginia Tech Hokies women's team.  The role is Wolff's first job coaching a women's team.  Prior to the role, Wolff served as director of basketball operations and assistant to the head coach for the Virginia Tech men's team. He is the former head coach of men's basketball at Boston University, a position from which he was fired on March 11, 2009, after 15 seasons.

Wolff, a native of New York City, finished his collegiate basketball career at UConn after playing two years at LSU.  He became the head coach at Boston University following the 1993–94 season, taking over for Bob Brown.  He was previously the head coach at Connecticut College, where he coached from 1980 to 1982.  In between his head coaching jobs, Wolff was an assistant at St. Bonaventure, Wake Forest, SMU, and the University of Virginia.  Wolff left BU with a record of 247–197, the most wins in school history.  His career overall record is 277–215 in men's college basketball and 62–93 in women's.

The following season, Wolff was the Director of Operations for Virginia Tech under Seth Greenberg.

That following season, athletic director Jim Weaver named him the new Virginia Tech women's basketball coach.

After bringing the Virginia Tech women's basketball team to the postseason, making the NIT, for the first time since 2006–07, Wolff was fired on March 22, 2016.

In June 2016, Wolff was named Director of basketball Operations for Old Dominion University by head coach Jeff Jones.

Family
Wolff and his wife, JoAnn, have three children: Nicole, Matthew and Michael. Nicole played for the University of Connecticut women's basketball team, while Matthew played for his father at Boston University and is an assistant coach at American University.  Michael played hockey at Brown University.

Head coaching record

Men's

Women's

References

External links
 Old Dominion profile 

1955 births
Living people
American men's basketball coaches
American men's basketball players
American women's basketball coaches
Basketball coaches from New York (state)
Basketball players from New York (state)
Boston University Terriers men's basketball coaches
College men's basketball head coaches in the United States
Connecticut College Camels men's basketball coaches
LSU Tigers basketball players
Old Dominion Monarchs men's basketball coaches
SMU Mustangs men's basketball coaches
St. Bonaventure Bonnies men's basketball coaches
UConn Huskies men's basketball players
Virginia Cavaliers men's basketball coaches
Virginia Tech Hokies men's basketball coaches
Virginia Tech Hokies women's basketball coaches
Wake Forest Demon Deacons men's basketball coaches
Guards (basketball)